Mühlenbach may refer to:
 Mühlenbach, a town in Ortenau district, Baden-Württemberg, Germany
 Mühlenbach, a location in the town of Waldbröl, North Rhine-Westphalia, Germany

Streams and rivers in Germany  

in Baden-Württemberg:
 Mühlenbach (Kinzig)
 Mühlenbach (Kocher)

in Lower Saxony:
 Mühlenbach (Glane)
 Mühlenbach (Hamme)

in North Rhine-Westphalia:
 Mühlenbach (Eggel)
 Mühlenbach (Emmer)
 Mühlenbach (Ems)
 Mühlenbach (Erft)
 Mühlenbach (Lenne)
 Mühlenbach (Leppe)
 Mühlenbach (Nette)
 Mühlenbach (Ruhr)
 Mühlenbach (Schwalm)
 Mühlenbach (Schwarzbach)
 Mühlenbach (Werre)
 Halterner Mühlenbach

See also 
 Muhlenbach (disambiguation)
 Mühlebach (disambiguation)
 Mühlbach (disambiguation)